Notostigma is a genus of ants in the subfamily Formicinae and the sole member of the tribe Notostigmatini. Its two species are known only from Australia. Workers are nocturnal and forage solitarily. Notostigma was first described by Emery (1920), when he erected the new genus for three species of carpenter ants (Camponotus).

Species
 Notostigma carazzii (Emery, 1895)
 Notostigma foreli Emery, 1920

References

External links

Formicinae
Ant genera
Hymenoptera of Australia